Yathkyed Lake (variant: Haecoligua; meaning: "white swan") is a lake in Kivalliq Region, Nunavut, Canada. Located between Angikuni Lake and Forde Lake, it is one of several lakes on the Kazan River.

Yathkyed lake was named by the Sayisi Dene, historical barren-ground caribou hunters of the area.  Caribou Inuit artifacts have also been found here.

Lake Yathkyed contains the only lake on an island in a lake on an island in a lake in the world, and the only islands within such a lake.

Geography
It is part of the Hearne Domain, Western Churchill province of the Churchill craton, which is the northwest section of the Canadian Shield.

Minerals
The Yathkyed Sedimentary Basin is notable for its uranium, copper, and molybdenum deposits.

See also
List of lakes of Nunavut
List of lakes of Canada

References

External links
 Map, including area lakes
 Photos, Geological Survey of Canada, 2007

Lakes of Kivalliq Region